Bettina Francion Bradbury (July 22, 1955 – January 13, 2019) was an American television soap opera screenwriter. She was the daughter of American science fiction writer Ray Bradbury.

Positions held
All My Children (hired by Megan McTavish)
Screenwriter: 1993 – January 20, 2006
As the World Turns (hired by Jean Passanante) 
Screenwriter: July 14, 2006 – January 7, 2007
Capitol
Screenwriter: 1984 – 1987
Days of Our Lives (hired by Hogan Sheffer)
Screenwriter: January 16, 2007 – January 16, 2008; April 23, 2008 - May 16, 2008
One Life to Live (hired by Dena Higley)
Screenwriter: April 4, 2006 – June 13, 2006
Santa Barbara
Screenwriter: 1991 – 1993

Awards and nominations
Daytime Emmy Award 
Nominations, 1995, 1999, and 2001–2003, Best Writing, All My Children
Wins, 1996–1998, Best Writing, All My Children
First nomination shared with: Agnes Nixon, Megan McTavish, Hal Corley, Frederick Johnson, N. Gail Lawrence, Jeff Beldner, Karen Lewis, Elizabeth Smith, Michelle Patrick, Ralph Wakefield, and  Pete T. Rich 
Writers Guild of America Award
Wins, 1996, 1998, 2000, 2001 and 2003 seasons, All My Children
Nominations, 1992, 1995–2001, and 2003 seasons, All My Children
Win, 1991 season, Santa Barbara

References

External links

wga awards
2006
DAYS fires writing staff (UPDATE) - Days of Our Lives News - Soaps.com

American soap opera writers
Daytime Emmy Award winners
American women television writers
Ray Bradbury
Place of birth missing
Women soap opera writers
1955 births
2019 deaths
20th-century American screenwriters
20th-century American women writers
21st-century American screenwriters
21st-century American women writers